Roskilde 07.07.07 is the second live album by the Danish rock band Nephew.

Track listing 

"Bazooka" – 9:33
"Science Fiction Og Familien" – 4:53
"Superliga" – 3:48
"First Blood Harddisk" – 5:26
"Blå & Black" – 3:49
"Movieclip" – 4:49
"USA DSB" – 4:06
"T-Kryds" – 6:55
"Igen & Igen &" – 5:54
"Mexico Ligger I Spanien" – 5:12
"Worst/Best Case Scenario" – 8:13
"Hospital feat. L.O.C." – 5:25
"En Wannabe Darth Vader" – 6:10
"The Way I Are Nephew Remix" – 3:48

Nephew (band) albums
2007 live albums